Rostislav Olesz (born 10 October 1985) is a professional ice hockey left winger for HC Olomouc of the Czech Extraliga (ELH). Olesz was drafted in the first round, seventh overall, by the Florida Panthers in the 2004 NHL Entry Draft.

Playing career
On 24 June 2011, Olesz was traded by the Florida Panthers to the Chicago Blackhawks in exchange for defenceman Brian Campbell. On 17 November 2011, Olesz was assigned by the Blackhawks to their American Hockey League (AHL) affiliate, the Rockford IceHogs, after clearing waivers.

On 28 June 2013, Olesz became an unrestricted free agent after the Blackhawks used one of their compliance buyouts on the remainder of his contract. Olesz quickly signed a one-year contract as a free agent with the New Jersey Devils on 5 July 2013. Olesz made his Devils debut to begin the 2013–14 season, but sparingly played ten games and registering only two assists before he was reassigned to their AHL affiliate, the Albany Devils. After five games in the AHL, Olesz was placed on unconditional waivers by the Devils with the intention to mutually terminate his contract. On 21 November, Olesz left North America and signed for the remainder of the season with the Swiss club SC Bern of the National League A.

Career statistics

Regular season and playoffs

International

References

External links
 

1985 births
Living people
Albany Devils players
Chicago Blackhawks players
Czech ice hockey left wingers
Florida Panthers draft picks
Florida Panthers players
HC Vítkovice players
Ice hockey players at the 2006 Winter Olympics
Medalists at the 2006 Winter Olympics
National Hockey League first-round draft picks
New Jersey Devils players
Olympic bronze medalists for the Czech Republic
Olympic ice hockey players of the Czech Republic
Olympic medalists in ice hockey
Rochester Americans players
Rockford IceHogs (AHL) players
SC Bern players
Sportspeople from Ostrava
HC Sparta Praha players
SCL Tigers players
HC Olomouc players
Czech expatriate ice hockey players in the United States
Czech expatriate ice hockey players in Switzerland